The Aktau Range is a mountain range of Tajikistan. It lies in the west of Tajikistan, south of Hisor.

References

Mountain ranges of Tajikistan